Old Friendship United Methodist Church is a historic United Methodist church located in West Post Office, Worcester County, Maryland. It is a one-story, gable-front, frame building erected in 1866. It received improvements through the 1920s and reflects rural interpretations of the Italianate and Greek Revival styles.  Surrounding the church is a small churchyard containing several hundred 19th and 20th century grave markers.

It was listed on the National Register of Historic Places in 1996.

References

External links
, including photo from 1988, at Maryland Historical Trust

United Methodist churches in Maryland
Churches on the National Register of Historic Places in Maryland
Churches in Worcester County, Maryland
Churches completed in 1866
19th-century Methodist church buildings in the United States
Italianate architecture in Maryland
Greek Revival church buildings in Maryland
1866 establishments in Maryland
National Register of Historic Places in Worcester County, Maryland
Italianate church buildings in the United States